The 2014–15 Austrian Hockey League was a season of the Austrian Hockey League. HC Bolzano were the defending Champions after defeating EC Red Bull Salzburg in the 2014 Championship. In the conclusion to the season, EC Red Bull Salzburg won the double in the League standings and the Championship.

First round

Regular season standings

Second round

Final round standings

Qualification round standings

Playoffs

References

External links 

Erste Bank Eishockey Liga Spieler Statistik

Austrian Hockey League seasons
Aus
1
2014–15 in Slovenian ice hockey
2014–15 in Italian ice hockey
2014–15 in Hungarian ice hockey
2014–15 in Czech ice hockey